Cabrero is a city and commune in the Bío Bío Province, Bío Bío Region, Chile.

History 
The city of Cabrero, has its origins in the progressive group of people, which established a station to serve the needs of the inhabitants of several rural properties in the area, and then the arrival of immigrants mainly from Middle East and Italy.

Demography 
A 3.35% (7,245 pop.) Of these, 18,037 (71.3%) lived in urban areas and 7,245 (28.7%) in rural areas. The population grew by 16.5% (3,577 persons) between the 1992 and 2002 censuses.

Administration
As a commune, Cabrero is a third-level administrative division of Chile administered by a municipal council, headed by an alcalde who is directly elected every four years. The 2008-2012 alcalde is Hasan Sabag Castillo (PDC).

Within the electoral divisions of Chile, Cabrero is represented in the Chamber of Deputies by Jorge Sabag (PDC) and Frank Sauerbaum (RN) as part of the 42nd electoral district, together with San Fabián, Ñiquén, San Carlos, San Nicolás, Ninhue, Quirihue, Cobquecura, Treguaco, Portezuelo, Coelemu, Ránquil, Quillón, Bulnes and Yumbel. The commune is represented in the Senate by Alejandro Navarro Brain (MAS) and Hosain Sabag Castillo (PDC) as part of the 12th senatorial constituency (Biobío-Cordillera).

Saltos del Laja
The Saltos del Laja are about 25 km south of the city of Cabrero.

References

External links 
  Municipality of Cabrero

Port settlements in Chile
Communes of Chile
Populated places in Bío Bío Province